The 2016–17 Tunisian Ligue Professionnelle 1 (Tunisian Professional League) season was the 91st season of top-tier football in Tunisia. The competition started on 8 September 2016. The defending champions from the previous season are Étoile du Sahel.

Teams
A total of 16 teams will contest the league, including 13 sides from the 2015–16 season and three promoted from the 2015–16 Ligue 2. AS Gabès was the first to obtain promotion, followed by Olympique Béja and finally US Tataouine. The three teams replaced EGS Gafsa, AS Kasserine and Stade Tunisien who were relegated to 2016–17 Tunisian Ligue 2. The teams are drawn in two groups of 8 each. At the end of the first part of the season, the first 3 will qualify to the Championship Group, the 4th to 7th will contest the Relegation Group and the 8th of each group will be relegated to the Ligue 2. Étoile du Sahel are the defending champions from the 2015–16 season.

Stadiums and locations

Results

Group A

Group A table

Group A result table

Group A leaders

Group B

Group B table

Group B result table

Group B leaders

Playoffs

Championship Group

League table

Result table

Leaders

Relegation Group

Relegation Group table

Relegation Group result table

Relegation Group leaders

Top goalscorers

Relegation playoff
This game was played between the 6th of the Relegation Group and the 3rd of Ligue 2.

See also
2016–17 Tunisian Ligue Professionnelle 2
2016–17 Tunisian Ligue Professionnelle 3
2016–17 Tunisian Cup

References

External links
 2016–17 Ligue 1 on RSSSF.com
 Fédération Tunisienne de Football

Tunisian Ligue Professionnelle 1 seasons